Shalini Bharat is Director of Tata Institute of Social Sciences (TISS), Mumbai.

Academic contribution
Bharat has worked extensively in the field of HIV/AIDS and wrote several articles in identifying stigmas, gaps and recommendation highlighting the current scenario of Health Systems in India.

References

Indian women social scientists
Living people
Year of birth missing (living people)